The 2016 St Albans City and District Council election took place on 5 May 2016 to elect members of St Albans City and District Council in England. This was on the same day as other local elections.

Summary Results

Ward results

Ashley

Batchwood

Clarence

Cunningham

Harpenden East

Harpenden North

Harpenden South

Harpenden West

London Colney

Marshalswick North

Marshalswick South

Park Street

Redbourn

Sopwell

St Peters

St Stephen

Verulam

Wheathampstead

By-elections between 2016 and 2018
A by-election was held in Clarence on 20th October 2016, after the resignation of Liberal Democrat councillor Sam Rowlands. The seat was held by the new Liberal Democrat candidate, Ellie Hudspith.

References

2016 English local elections
2016
2010s in Hertfordshire